Asterolasia buckinghamii is a species of slender, erect shrub in the family Rutaceae and is endemic to eastern New South Wales. It has star-shaped hairs on its young branches, broadly egg-shaped, hairy leaves and yellow flowers with rust-coloured, star-shaped hairs on the back of the petals.

Description
The leaves are covered with star-shaped hairs, densely so on the lower surface and the upper surface has a longitudinal groove. Flowering occurs from October to November.

Taxonomy
This species was first described in 1940 by William Blakely who gave it the name Phebalium buckinghamii and published the description in The Australian Naturalist. The following year, Blakely changed the name to Asterolasia buckinghamii. The specific epithet (buckinghamii) honours "Mr. William J. Buckingham of Lindfield, New South Wales".

Distribution and habitat
Asterolasia buckinghamii grows in gullies and on river flats or on slopes near cliff tops. It occurs in the Wingello district and between Mittagong and Lithgow in New South Wales.

References

buckinghamii
Sapindales of Australia
Flora of New South Wales
Plants described in 1940
Taxa named by William Blakely